Orthosia tenuimacula is a species of cutworm or dart moth in the family Noctuidae first described by William Barnes and James Halliday McDunnough in 1913. It is found in North America.

The MONA or Hodges number for Orthosia tenuimacula is 10498.

References

Further reading

 
 
 

Orthosia
Articles created by Qbugbot
Moths described in 1913